"Should I Stay or Should I Go" is a song by the English punk rock band The Clash.

Should I Stay or Should I Go or similar may also refer to:
 "Should I Stay or Should I Go", a song by Mack 10 from the album The Recipe
 Should I Stay or Should I Go (D:TNG episode), an episode of television series Degrassi: The Next Generation
 "Should I Stay Or Should I Go?", an episode of the Canadian drama Instant Star
 Should I Stay or Should I Go?, the title of a book by Ramani Durvasula